The Blånabbane Nunataks are a small group of nunataks about  east of Mount Twintop in Mac. Robertson Land. They were mapped and named by Norwegian cartographers working from air photos taken by the Lars Christensen Expedition, 1936–37.

See also 
Poulton Peak

References 

Nunataks of Mac. Robertson Land